Denis Alexandrovich Leushin (born 25 July 1985) is a Russian former competitive figure skater. He placed 13th at the 2004 World Junior Championships in The Hague and won gold at the 2010 Golden Spin of Zagreb. After retiring from competition, he began working as a coach in Russia.

Competitive highlights 
JGP: Junior Grand Prix

Programs

References

External links 
 

Russian male single skaters
1985 births
Living people
Sportspeople from Kirov, Kirov Oblast
Competitors at the 2011 Winter Universiade